James Hardin may refer to:

James Hardin, co-founder of Camden House Publishing
Jim Hardin (1943–1991), American baseball player
James Timothy Hardin or Tim Hardin (1941–1980), American musician

See also
James Harden (born 1989), American basketball player
James Harden (disambiguation)
James Harding (disambiguation)